The Adoration of the Magi is a painting of 1633–34 by the Flemish Baroque artist Peter Paul Rubens, made as an altarpiece for a convent in Louvain.  It is now in King's College Chapel, Cambridge, in England. It measures .

History
It was painted in 1633–34 as an altarpiece for the chapel at the Convent of the White Nuns in Louvain, at that time in the Spanish Netherlands and now in Belgium. A preparatory oil sketch for this painting is in the Wallace Collection, London. It was engraved by Hans Witdoeck in 1638.

The painting was sold after the 1780 suppression of convents, and came into the collection of William Petty, 1st Marquess of Lansdowne in England in 1788. After his death it was sold in 1806 to Robert Grosvenor, 2nd Earl Grosvenor (later Marquess of Westminster) and descended through the Grosvenor family.

The painting was sold from the estate of Hugh Grosvenor, 2nd Duke of Westminster at Sotheby's in 1959 and bought for a world-record price of £250,000 by the property millionaire Alfred Ernest Allnatt.  Two years later he offered it to King's College, Cambridge. 

The college accepted "this munificent gift" with the intention of displaying the painting in the college chapel, possibly as an altarpiece. The painting was initially displayed in the college's antechapel, but the decision was taken to modify the east end of the main chapel so it could be installed as an altarpiece. The floor at the east end was lowered by removing the three steps leading up to the altar so the painting would not obscure the chapel's stained glass windows, and wooden fittings – oak panelling, and a communion rail and reredos installed in 1906 to designs by Detmar Blow were also removed.  The changes remain controversial   with criticism of the destruction of "irreplaceable features" causing "incalculable" damage to the building's spirituality, just so the painting would look good in television broadcasts of the chapel's annual Festival of Nine Lessons and Carols.

A wooden triptych frame was created for the painting, which included a new harlequin grisaille, and Rubens' painting was installed at the east end of the chapel in 1968, where it remains.  

In June 1974 the painting was vandalised, with two-foot-high letters "IRA" scratched on it.

See also
 Adoration of the Magi (Rubens), for other treatments of the subject by Rubens
Adoration of the Magi (Filippino Lippi)
Adoration of the Magi (Gentile da Fabriano) 
Adoration of the Magi of 1475 (Botticelli)
Adoration of the Magi (Andrea della Robbia)
Adoration of the Magi (Leonardo)
Adoration of the Magi (Mantegna)
Adoration of the Magi (Velázquez)

Notes

Paintings by Peter Paul Rubens
1634 paintings
Rubens
Paintings in Cambridge
Vandalized works of art in the United Kingdom